Grete-Lilijane Küppas (born 16 June 1994) is an Estonian former footballer who last played as a defender for Naiste Meistriliiga club Tammeka Tartu. She has represented the Estonia women's national football team.

References

External links

1994 births
Living people
Estonian women's footballers
Estonia women's international footballers
South Alabama Jaguars women's soccer players
Women's association football defenders
Tartu JK Tammeka (women) players